Paradoxus osyridellus is a moth of the family Yponomeutidae. It is found in France, Spain, Portugal, Croatia, Greece Mexico  and on Sardinia.

The larvae feed on olives, injuring the tender shoots.

Gallery

References

Moths described in 1869
Yponomeutidae
Moths of Europe